Ruth Sorenson also known as Grandma Sorenson is a main character in Brandon Mull's fantasy series Fablehaven.

In the books

Fablehaven
Grandma Sorenson is Grandpa Sorenson's wife, Ruth. She got turned into a chicken by a genie who is prisoner in the dungeon beneath the house.  She was trying to gain information from the genie, but when one asks a genie a question one must first answer any question put to them by the genie.  If you find yourself unwilling to answer the question, or if you lie, the genie is allowed to take a small revenge on you.  This one turned Grandma into a chicken.  Grandpa named her Goldilocks to keep the situation hidden from the children, but he did put the cage in the kids' room and allow them to play with her and take care of her. In Fablehaven when all seems lost Grandma/Goldilocks spells out "I M GRAM" on the floor with her kernels of food and they take her to Muriel to change her back. After Muriel gets released, Grandma takes them to Nero the troll because he has a seeing stone and can tell them where Grandpa and Lena are being held. But they must trade something for this information. They convince him to accept a massage from Grandma in return for the information, and he agrees. They then go to rescue Grandpa and Lena, but things do not go well, and everyone ends up captured except Kendra, who eventually saves them all.

Fablehaven: Rise of the Evening Star
Grandma has a minor role in book 2. She ends up getting captured by Vanessa and Christopher Vogal. Grandma reveals that the reason she was a chicken was because a jinn changed her into one because she did not answer the jinn's question.

Fablehaven: Grip of the Shadow Plague
In the third book, Grandma gets turned into a shadow along with Grandpa.  Kendra and Seth must destroy the Shadow Plague to save them.  Grandma refuses to place any trust whatsoever in Vanessa.

Fablehaven: Secrets of the Dragon Sanctuary
In book 4, Grandma has only a minor role. She takes Kendra and Seth to a hotel on Winter Solstice.  Grandma still is doubtful about Vanessa.

Fablehaven: Keys to the Demon Prison
In book 5, Grandma opens the Doomsday Capsule left by Patton Burgess.  After being part of a failed rescue mission, Grandma is imprisoned at Living Mirage until the Sphinx came to make his minions step down.  Minor role.

Film
A Fablehaven film has been confirmed but it is unknown who will play any of the characters.

Fablehaven series